The 1894 Minnesota Senate election was held in the U.S. state of Minnesota on November 6, 1894, to elect members to the Senate of the 29th and 30th Minnesota Legislatures.

The Minnesota Republican Party won a large majority of seats, followed by the new People's Party and the Minnesota Democratic Party. The new Legislature convened on January 8, 1895.

Numerous Democratic candidates were also endorsed by the People's Party, and one was also endorsed by the Prohibition Party. However, all planned to caucus with the Democrats in the Senate, and are thus listed as part of their total.

Results 

*These totals count candidates endorsed by the Democratic and People's Parties in the totals for the Democratic Party.

See also 

 Minnesota gubernatorial election, 1894

References 

1894 Minnesota elections
Minnesota
Minnesota Senate elections